Obelagnostus is a genus of trilobite in the order Agnostida, which existed in what is now Antarctica. It was described by Shergold and Webers in 1992, and the type species is Obelagnostus imitor.

References

Agnostidae
Trilobites of Antarctica